If You're Going Through Hell is the second studio album by American country music artist Rodney Atkins. It was released on July 18, 2006 by Curb Records. The album was certified platinum by the Recording Industry Association of America (RIAA) after selling at least one million copies in the United States.

The album's first four singles — "If You're Going Through Hell (Before the Devil Even Knows)", "Watching You", "These Are My People" and "Cleaning This Gun (Come On In Boy)" — all reached number one on the U.S. Billboard Hot Country Songs chart between 2006 and 2008. In addition, "If You're Going Through Hell (Before the Devil Even Knows" and "Watching You" were declared by Billboard as the Number One country songs of 2006 and 2007, respectively. The song "Invisibly Shaken" was originally recorded by Lee Greenwood on his 2003 album Stronger Than Time. Atkins' version of that song was released as the album's fifth and final single in early 2008 and peaked at No. 41.

Track listing

Chart performance

Weekly charts

Year-end charts

Singles

Certifications

Personnel
From If You're Going Through Hell liner notes.

Musicians
Mike Brignardello - bass guitar
Jim "Moose" Brown - piano
Skip Cleavinger - Uilleann pipes
Larry Franklin - fiddle, mandolin
Rob Hajacos - fiddle
Ted Hewitt - electric guitar, acoustic guitar, background vocals
Angela Hurt - background vocals
Mike Johnson - pedal steel guitar, lap steel guitar
Julian King - percussion
Troy Lancaster - electric guitar
B. James Lowry - acoustic guitar
Brent Mason - electric guitar
Gordon Mote - piano, Hammond organ
Larry Paxton - bass guitar
Gary Prim - piano, Hammond organ
Scotty Sanders - pedal steel guitar
Steve Sheehan - acoustic guitar
Wanda Vick - banjo
John Willis - acoustic guitar, banjo
Lonnie Wilson - drums

Crowd noise: Aaron Bowlin, Justin Luffman, Jenn Poppe, Kathryn Vieira, Steven Sheehan, Tammy Jo Atkins, Natalie Stout, "GiGi", Karla Hewitt, Angela Hurt, "Angela Hurt's mom", Clayton Bozeman, Kevin Rapillo, Sandi Harrison, James and Tecia Hedden, Lindsey Herren, Danielle Chaffin, Rhonda Chaffin, Doug Barnard, Colin Campbell, Belinda Smith, Marianne Mashburne, Terje Bratsveen, Charlie and Nicole Miralez, Jenny Tackett, Shawn and Kelly Pody

Technical
 Rodney Atkins - producer, engineering
 Billy Decker - mixing
 Tony Green - recording
 Ted Hewitt - producer, engineering
 P.T. Houston - recording
 Julian King - mixing
 Craig White - recording
 Hank Williams - mastering

References

2006 albums
Rodney Atkins albums
Curb Records albums